Yvrench is a commune in the Somme department in Hauts-de-France in northern France.

Geography
Yvrench is situated 9 miles(15 km) northeast of Abbeville, on the D108 road, the route of the old Roman road, the  Chaussée Brunehaut.

Population

See also
Communes of the Somme department

References

Communes of Somme (department)